Algernon Greville (1798–1864) was an English soldier and cricketer, and Bath King of Arms.

Algernon Greville may also refer to:

 Algernon Greville (MP) (c.1677–1720), Member of Parliament for Warwick
 Algernon Greville, 2nd Baron Greville (1841–1909), Member of Parliament for Westmeath

See also
 For other people with the given name Algernon, see Algernon (name)
 For other uses and people with the name of Greville, see Greville (disambiguation)
 For other uses of Algernon, see Algernon (disambiguation)